Manuherikia was a parliamentary electorate in the Otago region of New Zealand. It existed from 1866 to 1870 and was represented by two Members of Parliament.

Population centres

The electorate included the towns of Alexandra, Cromwell, Ranfurly and Roxburgh.

History

The electorate was formed for the 1866 election. It existed for one term only, i.e. until the end of the 4th New Zealand Parliament in 1870.

Members
The electorate was represented by two Members of Parliament:

Key

Election results

1867 Manuherikia by-election

References

Historical electorates of New Zealand
1865 establishments in New Zealand
1870 disestablishments in New Zealand